TUDN (formerly Televisa Deportes) is a division of the Mexican television broadcaster Televisa that produces sports programming for Las Estrellas, Canal 5, Nueve, Foro TV and the TUDN TV channel.

On July 20, 2019, Televisa Deportes was renamed TUDN, in a rebranding which Televisa Deportes Network TV channel also changed its name, along with Univision Deportes programming division and UDN TV channel in the United States. The new branding is a combination of abbreviations TDN and UDN, but the first two letters are also pronounced as the Spanish adjective "tu" (your), allowing the name to also be read as "Tu deportes network" ("Your sports network"). TUDN will be promoted as a multi-platform brand, and there will be closer collaboration between the Mexican and American counterparts—allowing for expanded studio programming in the morning and daytime hours (to bolster its expansion into European soccer with its recent acquisition of UEFA rights, and existing content such as Liga MX soccer).

Notable personalities

Present

Play-by-play

Analysts 

 Carlos Alberto Etcheverry
 Damián Zamogilny
 Emanuel Villa
 Francisco Fonseca
 Hugo Salcedo
 Ileana Dávila
 Marc Crosas
 Marco Antonio Rodríguez
 Moisés Muñoz
 Oswaldo Sánchez
 Rafael Márquez

Anchors 

 
 Tania Rincón

References

External links
 

Televisa
Sports mass media in Mexico
Sports divisions of TV channels